Rank comparison chart of Non-commissioned officer and enlisted ranks for navies of Hispanophone states.

Other ranks

See also
Comparative navy enlisted ranks of the Americas
Ranks and insignia of NATO navies enlisted

References

Military ranks of Hispanophone countries 
Military comparisons